In electronics, a lead is an electrical connection consisting of a length of wire or a metal pad (surface-mount technology) that is designed to connect two locations electrically. Leads are used for many purposes, including: transfer of power; testing of an electrical circuit to see if it is working, using a test light or a multimeter; transmitting information, as when the leads from an electrocardiograph are attached to a person's body to transmit information about their heart rhythm; and sometimes to act as a heatsink. The tiny leads coming off through-hole electronic components are also often called pins; in ball grid array packages, they are in form of small spheres, and are therefore called "balls".

Many electrical components such as capacitors, resistors, and inductors have only two leads, while some integrated circuits can have several hundred or even more than a thousand for the largest ball grid array packages. Integrated circuit pins often either bend under the package body like a letter "J" (J-lead) or come out, down, and form a flat foot for securing to the board (S-lead or gull-lead). 

Most kinds of integrated circuit packaging are made by placing a silicon chip on a lead frame, wire bonding the chip to the metal leads of the lead frame, and covering the chip with plastic. The metal leads protruding from the plastic are then either "cut long" and bent to form through-hole pins, or "cut short" and bent to form surface-mount leads. Such lead frames are used for surface mount packages with leads – such as Small Outline Integrated Circuit Quad Flat Package  – and for through-hole packages such as dual in-line package  – and even for so-called "leadless" or "nolead" packages – such as Quad Flat Noleads package.

The lead frame (and therefore the pins, if any, formed from that lead frame) are occasionally made from Invar or similar alloys, due to their low coefficient of thermal expansion.

Electrical effects
For many circuit designs it can be assumed that the leads do not contribute to the electrical effects of individual components. However, this assumption begins to break down at higher frequencies and at very small scales. These effects come from the physical construction of the leads. The leads are often metal connections that run from the rest of the circuit to the materials that each component is made of. This design results in a very small capacitance between the ends of the leads where they connect to the device and very small inductances and resistances along each lead. Because the impedance of each component is a function of the frequency of the signals being passed through the device and the inductance and capacitance of the device the leads can cause substantial variation in the properties of components in radio frequency circuits.

See also 
 Through-hole technology

References

Electrical components